"The Lane" is a song by American recording artist Ice-T. It was released in 1996 as a single from the rapper's sixth studio album Ice-T VI: Return of the Real through  Records/Virgin Records. The song was written and produced by Tracy "Ice-T" Marrow and Richard "DJ Ace" Ascencio. The single peaked at number 18 in the UK. "The Lane (E.V.A. Mix)" was later included in the rapper's greatest hits album Greatest Hits: The Evidence.

Track listing 

Sample credits
 Track "The Lane (E.V.A. Mix)" contains elements from "E.V.A." by Jean-Jacques Perrey from his 1970 album Moog Indigo
 Track "The Lane" contains elements from "UFO" by E.S.G. from their 1981 EP ESG

Personnel 
 Tracy Lauren Marrow – lyrics, vocals, producer
 Wesley "Mr. Wesside" Dawson – vocals (track 3)
 Richard "DJ Ace" Ascencio – producer, re-mixing (track 3)
 Shafiq "SLJ" Husayn – producer
 Secret Squirrel – re-mixing (track 1)
 Hills Archer Ink – artwork
 Jorge Hinojosa – management

Chart positions

References

External links 
 

1996 songs
1996 singles
Ice-T songs
Gangsta rap songs
Songs written by Ice-T